The 2007 UEFS Futsal Women's Championship was the 3rd women's UEFS futsal championship, held in Luhačovice, (Czech Republic) from 12 December to 16 December.

There were 5 teams in the competition: Czech Republic, Lithuania, Russia, Slovakia and Ukraine.

The championship was played in a league system and the Czech Republic won their first ever women's title.

Championship

Final standings

References

External links
UEFS website
womenfootball.ru website

UEFS Futsal Women's Championship
UEFS
2007–08 in Czech football
International futsal competitions hosted by the Czech Republic